Looking on Darkness  is a 1973 novel by prominent Afrikaans novelist Andre Brink. The novel was the first Afrikaans book to be banned by the South African government.

Development 
Seeking a readership abroad after being banned in South Africa, André Brink translated Kennis van die aand into English and published it abroad as Looking on Darkness. This was his first self-translation.

Production 
Kirkus review had mixed reception of the novel, writing "All of this has more validity as thesis than as fiction."

References 

Novels by André Brink
1973 novels
20th-century South African novels
Afrikaans literature